Leanid Kovel (born 29 July 1986) is a Belarusian football coach and a former player. He is an assistant coach with Smorgon.

Career
Before coming to Saturn Ramenskoye in 2008, he played for Karpaty Lviv for 2 years.

Kovel made his debut with the Belarus national football team in a friendly match against Turkey on 18 August 2004, entering as a second-half substitute.

After a 2021 season he finished his player career.

Honours
Dinamo Minsk
Belarusian Premier League champion: 2004

Minsk
Belarusian Cup winner: 2012–13

International goals

Career stats

References

External links
 
 
 
 

1986 births
Living people
Belarusian footballers
Association football forwards
Belarus international footballers
Belarus under-21 international footballers
Belarusian expatriate footballers
Belarusian expatriate sportspeople in Russia
Expatriate footballers in Russia
Expatriate footballers in Ukraine
Belarusian expatriate sportspeople in Ukraine
Expatriate footballers in Kazakhstan
Expatriate footballers in Latvia
Belarusian Premier League players
Russian Premier League players
Ukrainian Premier League players
Kazakhstan Premier League players
FC RUOR Minsk players
FC Dinamo Minsk players
FC Karpaty Lviv players
FC Saturn Ramenskoye players
FC Minsk players
FC Irtysh Pavlodar players
FC Neman Grodno players
FK RFS players
FC Belshina Bobruisk players
FC Smorgon players
Sportspeople from Grodno Region